Dabur Vatika Miss Nepal 2004, the 10th Miss Nepal pageant, was held at the Birendra International Convention Centre (BICC). There were protests by feminist activists.

Payal Shakya was crowned Miss Nepal 2004 on August 7, 2004 at Birendra International Convention Center. Sarah Gurung and Anita Gurung won the titles of 1st Runner up and 2nd Runner up, respectively.

Results

Color keys

Sub-Titles

Contestants

References

External links
 Miss Nepal 2004 website
 Miss Nepal website
 10ward Baneshwor

Beauty pageants in Nepal
2004 in Nepal
Miss Nepal